Potash Creek may refer to the following rivers:

 Potash Creek (Black River tributary), in New York
 Potash Creek (Delta Reservoir tributary), in New York